Daya is a 1998 Indian Malayalam period film written by M. T. Vasudevan Nair, directed by Venu, and starring Manju Warrier in the lead titular role. The storyline of the film is loosely adapted from the story of Zumurrud in the One Thousand and One Nights: the plot is somewhat different. Vishal Bhardwaj scored the music of the film. It was the directorial debut of cinematographer Venu. He won the awards for best debut director at the National Film Awards and Kerala State Film Awards.

Plot
The film is set in the Middle-East in the pre-Islam period. It is about the adventures of a lively and intelligent slave girl named Daya. Mansoor, the son of an aging and wealthy nobleman, is used to an extravagant way of life. Squandering his wealth after his father's death, he is forsaken by all his friends, except the loyal slave girl, Daya, who suggests that she be sold at the slave market for an exorbitant price. The envoys of the King interrupt the sale and take Daya to court, where she is tested for her intelligence, she passes and then she is showered with gifts. The King also allows her to live with Mansoor; But she gets kidnapped by Ali Shah and Rashid who has business of selling slave women. Mansoor with the help of his new neighbor Amina plans to save Daya from Ali Shah's kota. But Mansoor reaches late that night and Daya mistaking a man as Mansoor is taken away by a thief Minnal jawan. She is forced to masquerade as a man to save herself from Minnal jawan. As a man she travels to another kingdom. She goes to another kingdom where the king is searching for a loyal minister. She in the disguise of a man passes all the difficult tests like an archery competition and a sword fighting duel. She lets herself get defeated by the king in a chess match and impresses the king. The King makes her the minister. The King's daughter gets infatuated by her thinking she is a man. She as the minister intelligently takes revenge on everyone who ill-treated her with the help of Amina. She finally meets a confessional Mansoor and decides to elope with him as the king is planning her marriage with the princess. The King finds out the truth and decides to punish Daya - a woman who dared to challenge men. The people support Daya's wisdom and request king to forgive her as the kingdom needs Daya's wisdom as a minister. King forgives Daya and re appoints her as the minister. The story ends on a happy note with Daya and Mansoor getting married.

Cast

Awards
National Film Awards
 Indira Gandhi Award for Best Debut Film of a Director - Venu
 Best Costume Designer - S. B. Satheesan
 Best Choreographer - Brinda Master

Kerala State Film Awards
 Best Screenplay - M. T. Vasudevan Nair
 Best Debut Director - Venu
 Best Costume Designer - S. B. Satheesan
 Best Art Director - Sameer Chanda
 Best Editor - Beena Paul

Soundtrack
The soundtrack for the film was composed by Vishal Bhardwaj. The lyrics were written by O. N. V. Kurup.Sharreth composed the original background score of the movie.

"Kanni Penne" - K. J. Yesudas
"Neeyen Kamamohini" - Hariharan
"Saradendu" - K. S. Chithra
"Sneha Lolamam" - K. S. Chithra
"Sneha Lolamam" - Sudeep Kumar
"Swargam Thedi" - Sujatha
"Visada Ragam" - K. J. Yesudas
"Vishada Ragam" - Radhika Thilak

References

External links
 
 Daya at Oneindia.in

1998 films
1990s Malayalam-language films
Films with screenplays by M. T. Vasudevan Nair
Cross-dressing in Indian films
Films scored by Vishal Bhardwaj
Best Debut Feature Film of a Director National Film Award winners
Films that won the Best Costume Design National Film Award
Films featuring a Best Choreography National Film Award-winning choreography
1998 directorial debut films
Films based on One Thousand and One Nights